The Balkhab uprising was a Hazara rebellion in Balkhab district, Sar-e Pol Province, Afghanistan against the Taliban. It was led by Mehdi Mujahid, and it began on 23 June 2022 after Mehdi Mujahid's forces captured Balkhab district.

Initially, the Taliban did not take Mehdi Mujahid seriously when he declared war against them. After he gathered his own fighters and quickly took control of his native Balkhab district, the Taliban deployed troops and widely outnumbered Mehdi and his militants.

Background 
Tensions between the Taliban and Mehdi Mujahid, their only Hazara Shia commander, began following the Taliban takeover of Afghanistan when their leadership tried to gain greater control over coal mining in Balkhab.

The Taliban's limit was when he began publicly criticizing them for their treatment of Hazaras and other Shia Muslims, and the closure of girls schools. This gave them a reason to remove him as their head of intelligence in Bamyan province.

War 
After being expelled as the head of intelligence, Mehdi Mujahid left the Taliban and then declared war on them. Mehdi Mujahid quickly captured Balkhab district, removed the Taliban district governor and replaced him with a Shia Hazara from within his forces. After capturing Balkhab, Mehdi Mujahid said that no one could take the district from the Hazaras by force. The Taliban initially gathered an estimated 500 fighters and planned to capture Mehdi from two directions, one coming from Dara-i Sufi Bala District in Samangan Province and one coming from Yakawlang District in Bamyan Province. The Taliban had also asked its members from the ethnic Uzbek community in Jowzjan and Faryab provinces led by Qari Salahuddin Ayubi to provide at least 200 fighters to help capture Mehdi, but they refused.

, the entire Balkhab District was controlled by Mehdi Mujahid's forces.

On 23 June 2022, the Taliban attempted to take Balkhab, although they failed to even enter it due to the heavy resistance. In an official Tweet, Sebghat Ahmadi, an NRF spokesman, said that "today at 7 am, the Taliban tried attacking the brave and justice-seeking people of Balkhab from the Qom Kotal Sancharak route". According to locals, the Taliban sent troops to Balkhab from various directions to capture Mehdi Mujahid and defeat his forces. Mehdi Mujahid stated that his forces repelled two attacks by the Taliban on 23 June and one attack on the morning of 24 June and that they had killed a significant amount of Taliban fighters. Muhammad Mohaqiq, a Hazara politician, supported Mehdi and warned the Taliban that an attack on Mehdi Mujahid "would mean a war with the Hazaras".

The two sides engaged in battles in the Dezdan Valley, Dozdan Dara, Qom Kotal and Ab-e Kalan areas, and dozens of deaths and injuries were reported, with the Taliban having more losses. A source close to Mehdi Mujahid claimed that Taliban forces had withdrawn from several fronts after being overpowered by Mehdi's forces.

On 25 June, the Taliban launched an airstrike at the home of Mehdi Mujahid, although neither he nor his family was injured or killed.

On 3 July, the Taliban executed nine of Mehdi Mujahid's fighters who had surrendered. The Taliban fighters also committed many atrocities against Hazara civilians. On 6 July, the Taliban deployed almost 8,000 fighters and surrounded all of Balkhab district and banned anyone from leaving or entering. The Taliban also cut off all internet in Balkhab. Mehdi Mujahid urged his fighters to not lose hope and to fight hard against the Taliban.

Karim Khalili, another Hazara politician and leader of Hezbe Wahdat, criticized the Taliban for their treatment of the Balkhab civilians. He wrote that "In this war, there are clear signs of crimes against humanity; Civilians have been directly and intentionally attacked, people's houses and properties have been looted. In addition, the communication and networks of the region have been cut off and the transportation routes to provide food for the people have been cut off completely."

Sometime around early July, the Taliban captured Golwarz village near Bakhlab as part of their campaign against the rebels. Several war crimes were reportedly committed by the Taliban against the mostly Hazara population throughout the campaign, causing refugees to flee to the neighboring provinces.

The conflict ended with a Taliban victory and the death of Mehdi Mujahid.

War crimes and human rights abuses 

In the rural areas around Balkhab district, the Taliban committed a series of war crimes against the Shia Hazara population during the conflict. On 29 June 2022, the Afghan Independent Human Rights Commission (AIHRC) stated that the Taliban had executed civilians and prisoners of war, set fire to civilians' homes and bombed civilian infrastructure. AIHRC classified the Taliban's actions as constituting war crimes. As of 1 July, 23 civilians killed by the Taliban had been identified, and 29 remained unidentified, according to Rukhshana Media. On 2 July, Hasht-e Subh estimated that 150 civilians had been killed by the Taliban and that some had been tortured. An estimated 27,000 locals were also displaced. Ayatollah Sistani sent about 1,000 packages of food and other basic needs to the displaced Hazaras, and the Baba Mazari Foundation sent about 80 packages.

Other abuses included:
 Playing music and dancing in Shia Mosques, Shia seminaries, and Hazara-owned schools before turning them into military bases.
 Killing Hazaras due to their ethnicity.
 Seizing homes and vehicles belonging to Hazara civilians.
 Causing hundreds of families to flee to the mountains, and not allowing aid workers to reach them which led to the death of 3 infants.

References 

Sar-e Pol Province
Conflicts in 2022
Afghanistan conflict (1978–present)
June 2022 events in Afghanistan
Battles involving the Hazara people
Hazara history